Lillian Baumbach Jacobs was a plumber.

In 1951, at age 21, she became the first American woman to earn a master’s license in plumbing.

She made appearances on television shows, in magazines, and as a pin-up girl for an infantry company during the Korean War. 

She died of leukemia on January 31, 2000, at the age of 70.

References 

1930 births
2000 deaths
American plumbers